Bohdan Oleksiyovych Myshenko (born 29 December 1994) is a Ukrainian professional footballer who plays as a midfielder.

Career
Myshenko is a product of the youth team systems of FC Molod Poltava. He signed a contract with FC Metalurh Donetsk in 2012. He made his debut for FC Metalurh Donetsk in a game against FC Karpaty Lviv on 3 August 2014 in the Ukrainian Premier League.

References

External links

1994 births
Living people
Ukrainian footballers
Association football midfielders
Ukraine under-21 international footballers
Ukrainian expatriate footballers
Expatriate footballers in Moldova
Expatriate footballers in Georgia (country)
Expatriate footballers in Belarus
Ukrainian expatriate sportspeople in Moldova
Ukrainian expatriate sportspeople in Georgia (country)
Ukrainian expatriate sportspeople in Belarus
Ukrainian Premier League players
Ukrainian First League players
FC Metalurh Donetsk players
FC Milsami Orhei players
FC Desna Chernihiv players
FC Dinamo Tbilisi players
FC Torpedo-BelAZ Zhodino players
FC Oleksandriya players
FC Gomel players
FC Lviv players
Sportspeople from Cherkasy Oblast